Warren Lynn Kidd (born September 9, 1970), is an American former basketball player. A solid 6'9", 235 lbs center, he played a single National Basketball Association (NBA) season with the Philadelphia 76ers, with the rest of his career taking place in Europe.

College career

Kidd played for Middle Tennessee of the Ohio Valley Conference in the NCAA Division I from 1990 to 1993. He led NCAA Division I in rebounding during his last collegiate season in 1993.

Professional career
Though he went undrafted in the 1993 NBA draft, Kidd would be signed by the Philadelphia 76ers in October 1993.
He played 68 games for the 76ers, averaging 3.6 points and 3.4 rebounds in 13 minutes in his solitary season with the side.

He then moved to Europe where he played for the rest of his career.
Kidd first moved to Spain to play in the Liga ACB for Valencia, he would also suit up for Sevilla, Joventut Badalona and Tenerife.

He also played in the Italian Serie A, for Olimpia Milano and Virtus Roma, leading the league in rebounding with the latter in 1998–99.
 
With Olimpia Milano he would play in the European premier competition, the Euroleague - where he also led in rebounding in 1996-97 - and the second tier Saporta Cup, reaching the final in 1998.

See also
List of NCAA Division I men's basketball season rebounding leaders

External links 
FIBA Europe profile Retrieved on 10 June 2015.
Lega Basket Serie A profile Retrieved on 10 June 2015. 
NBA profile Retrieved on 10 June 2015.
RealGM profile Retrieved on 10 June 2015.

1970 births
Living people
African-American basketball players
American expatriate basketball people in Italy
American expatriate basketball people in Spain
American men's basketball players
Basketball players from Alabama
CB Canarias players
Real Betis Baloncesto players
Centers (basketball)
Joventut Badalona players
Lega Basket Serie A players
Liga ACB players
Middle Tennessee Blue Raiders men's basketball players
Olimpia Milano players
Pallacanestro Virtus Roma players
People from Shelby County, Alabama
Philadelphia 76ers players
Undrafted National Basketball Association players
Valencia Basket players
21st-century African-American sportspeople
20th-century African-American sportspeople